The Diocesan museum of Brescia is a museum in Italy dedicated to the artistic patrimony of the Diocese of Brescia, and is located in the greater cloister of the Monastery of Saint Joseph in via Gasparo Salò, a short distance from the Piazza della Loggia.

The museum, founded in 1978 by Bishop Luigi Morstabilini, contains numerous works of art from the entire diocesan territory, throughout the province of Brescia, including paintings, sculpture, gold and silver work, and liturgical vestments. In addition, the museum is the usual setting for the exposition of sacred art in the region.

History 
The idea for the creation of a museum for the diocese of Brescia first developed in the 1970s. The initiative was taken up by Monsignor Angelo Pietrobelli who identified the greater cloister of Saint Joseph as a site sufficiently spacious and  prestigious. The diocese's acquisition of the property was lengthy and complicated, and ultimately required special governmental legislation.

On December 23, 1978 the bishop of Brescia, Luigi Morstabilini, inaugurated a canonical religious foundation known as the "Diocesan Museum of Sacred Art".

On April 21, 1988 the bishop of Brescia, Bruno Foresti, substituted the old statute with a new one, to which, in addition to the collection and preservation of diocesan works of art that might be in danger of dispersion or ruin, he added initiatives of restoration as well as of cultural and educational outreach. Also, thanks to Bishop Foresti, the greater cloister of Saint Joseph was completely restored. The newer statute, revised by Bishop Giulio Sanguineti, was the basis for the civil recognition of the religious foundation.

From February 2010 the Diocesan Museum of Brescia has been recognized by the Italian state as a Fondazione di Religione e di Culto.

Works 
The museum is divided into four sections: 
 The diocesan gallery;
 Illuminated manuscripts;
 Precious metal works;
 Liturgical vestments.

Image gallery 

The gallery contains about a hundred works from the diocese's territory, among which are paintings by Giovanni Battista Pittoni, Il Moretto, Romanino, Andrea Celesti, Giuseppe Tortelli, Pietro Avogadro, Francesco Savanni, Paolo Veneziano and Giambattista Tiepolo.
 Giuseppe Amatore
 The Last Supper, late 16th century
 Antonio Calegari
 Crucifixion, wooden sculpture, middle of the 18th century
 Francesco Capella
 Rebecca at the well
 Andrea Celesti
 The Madonna with child among Saints Anne, James, and Benedict
 Antonio Cifrondi
 The twelve apostles, oil on canvas, end of the 17th century-beginning of the 18th century
 Il Moretto
 The Madonna with Child in glory with Saint John the Evangelist, Blessed Lorenzo Giustiniani and the allegory of Divine Wisdom
 Saint Rock nursed by an angel 
 Maffeo Olivieri
 The Botticino Crucifix, wood, after 1517
 Giovanni Battista Pittoni
 The Madonna with the child Jesus, Saint Leonard and Saint Francis da Paola, oil on canvas, first half of the 18th century
 Romanino
 Saint Jerome
 Giambattista Tiepolo
 The Baptism of Constantine, oil on canvas, 1757-1759
 Tintoretto
 Transfiguration, sketch for the  Transfiguration in the Church of Saint Angela Merici.
 Paolo Veneziano
 The Madonna with child, middle of the 14th century
 Antonio Vivarini
 Polyptych of Saint Ursula, tempera on wood, 1440-1445
 Francesco Zugno, Francesco Fontebasso, Battaglioli, Buratto, Maggiotto, Giuseppe Bazzani, Francesco Savanni
 Various Ex votos from the church of Saint Mary of the Patrocinio, 18th century-19th century

Illuminated manuscripts 

This section houses twenty-two illuminated manuscripts, dated from the 12th to the 16th century and coming exclusively from the capitular library of Brescia.  The oldest manuscripts were made for Jacopo de Atti, bishop of Brescia (1335 - 1344), and contain illuminations from the French and Bolognese schools. Of great importance:
 Bonizone da Sutri, De vita christiana o Capitolare 13, late 12th century
 Antifonary, 12th century, contains the first complete version of the office for the Feast of saints Faustino and Giovita, patrons of the city
 The Summa Theologiae of saint Thomas Aquinas, 14th century
 Liturgical books (missals and breviaries) and music (antifonaries and graduals) of the 15th century, decorated with illuminated initial letters, as well as floral and plant motifs
 Mariegola di Collio, 1523, illuminations from an artist influenced by Floriano Ferramola

Precious metal works 
The section containing gold and silver work is organized by era and by type, and displays a considerable collection of liturgical objects dated from the late 15th century to the 19th century. It includes works of silver and gold from Brescia, Venice, and Milan.  Of particular interest:
 An architectonic thurible (15th century), embossed copper, of the Lombard-Venetian school
 A chalice decorated with enamels (late 15th century), Italian
 A processional cross (early 16th century) with jutting figures applied to the tops of the arms, and clipeuses decorated with carved figures
 The Gambara reliquary (middle of the 16th century), in ebony and silver, made by a Roman silversmith
 A monstrance (early 17th century), embossed silver with punching, by Girolamo Quadri
 The chalice of Pontevico (1714), a masterpiece in gold, silver, and precious stones by Milanese jeweler Carlo Grossi
 The reliquary of Saint Gaudenzio
 The reliquary of Saint Crispin
 An altar cross, gold-plated with precious stones from the church of Saint Eufemia of Fonte

Liturgical vestments 
The section, inaugurated in 1997, includes a collection of liturgical vestments (end of the 15th - early 19th century), mostly of Venetian and French origin, exhibited by significance, color, symbolism, and style.  Of major interest:
 Germanic chasuble (early 16th century);
 Venetian chasuble in damask (1720 - 1730);
 French chasuble in lampas (1735 - 1740);
 French chasuble (1750 - 1760).
The collection also contains a reconstructed loom from the 17th century accompanied by illustrative panels which tell the story of weaving.

Bibliography 
 Giacomini Miari Erminia, Mariani Paola, Musei religiosi in Italia, Milano 2005, pp. 127 – 128
 Zuffi Stefano, I Musei Diocesani in Italia. Primo volume, Palazzolo sull'Oglio (BS) 2003, pp. 44 – 48

See also 
 Diocese of Brescia

External links 

 Official site of the museum (in Italian)

Museums in Brescia
1978 establishments in Italy
Museums established in 1978
Art museums and galleries in Lombardy
Religious museums in Italy